The Southern Highroads Trail is a  loop of scenic and historic highways in the Southeastern United States. The driving trail traverses 14 counties, four states, and four national forests, providing sightseers and passersby an array of culinary, hotel, shopping, and recreational options along the way.

Visitors can start at any point along the trail, and circle back to their starting point. In the process, they will visit parts of four southern states, cross the Appalachian Trail twice, and meander over the Eastern Continental Divide numerous times. They will alternately travel beside whitewater rivers or high atop mountains.

As travelers visit the communities beside the trail, they will see preserved settlements from the pioneer days and old homes, along with red brick courthouses.  A firsthand view of what mountain life is like, both now and then, is readily available.

The trail visits four National Forests: Chattahoochee National Forest in GA, Nantahala National Forest in NC, Cherokee National Forest in TN, and Sumter National Forest in SC.

History 

Incorporated in 1992, this scenic driving trail is supported by local, state, and nationwide organizations to give travelers an opportunity to view selected scenic parts of the lower Appalachian Trail and the Blue Ridge Mountain area. It was put together by an accumulation of country highways in the south that had significance in terms of history or natural beauty.

The Southern Highroads Trail is an important historical route that brings visitors face-to-face with the rich history and legends from the region's past. This was the homeland of the Cherokee Nation. The route encompasses the Chieftain's Trail which memorializes the Trail of Tears. Visitors can learn about the Cherokee Indians, and also the early settlers that came in search of gold, set up farms and made their homes here.

There are also many old railroad towns here, and some red brick courthouses that are the oldest in the United States, with many buildings being included on the National Historic Register. There are also many important Civil War battlefields in close proximity to the trail.

States 
Georgia
North Carolina
Tennessee
South Carolina

Roads 

The Southern Highroads Trail is pieced together by various Southeastern scenic highways that either run near or through the landscape of the Appalachian Trail.

Georgia State Route 52
U.S. Route 76 in Georgia and South Carolina
Georgia State Route 197 as a side road to Helen, GA
South Carolina Highway 183
South Carolina Highway 28
South Carolina Highway 107
South Carolina Highway S-37-413 or Wigington Road
South Carolina Highway 130
North Carolina Highway 281
U.S. Route 64 in North Carolina and Tennessee
U.S. Route 411 in Tennessee and Georgia
Scenic Highway 197 in Georgia

Major landmarks 

Chattahoochee National Forest
Sumter National Forest
Cherokee National Forest
Nantahala National Forest
Blue Ridge Scenic Railway
Fires Creek National Wildlife Reserve
Wine tasting in Cherokee County
Cullasaja Falls
Stumphouse Tunnel Complex
Lake Jocassee
Hiwassee River Rail Adventure

Towns along route 

Ellijay, Georgia
Blue Ridge, Georgia
Morganton, Georgia
Blairsville, Georgia
Young Harris, Georgia
Hiawassee, Georgia
Batesville, Georgia
Clarkesville, Georgia
Cornelia, Georgia
Clayton, Georgia
Westminster, South Carolina
Walhalla, South Carolina
Sapphire, North Carolina
Cashiers, North Carolina
Highlands, North Carolina
Franklin, North Carolina
Hayesville, North Carolina
Brasstown, North Carolina
Murphy, North Carolina
Copperhill, Tennessee
Ducktown, Tennessee
Conasauga, Tennessee
Eton, Georgia
Chatsworth, Georgia

References

External links 
 Geology
 Southern Highroads Association
 Explore Georgia
 Georgia State Website
 Georgia Tourist Guide
 Trail Map
 Southern Highroads Association
 Explore Georgia
 Georgia State Website
 Georgia Tourist Guide
 Trail Map

Scenic highways in the United States
Chattahoochee-Oconee National Forest
Nantahala National Forest
Sumter National Forest
Cherokee National Forest
U.S. Route 76
U.S. Route 64
U.S. Route 74
U.S. Route 441